The 2022 UEFA Europa League Final was the final match of the 2021–22 UEFA Europa League, the 51st season of Europe's secondary club football tournament organised by UEFA, and the 13th season since it was renamed from the UEFA Cup to the UEFA Europa League. It was played at Ramón Sánchez Pizjuán in Seville, Spain, on 18 May 2022, between German club Eintracht Frankfurt and Scottish club Rangers.

The final was originally scheduled to be played at the Puskás Aréna in Budapest, Hungary. However, due to the postponement and relocation of the 2020 final, the final hosts were shifted back a year, with Budapest instead hosting the 2023 final.

Eintracht Frankfurt won the match 5–4 on penalties, following a 1–1 draw after extra time, for their second UEFA Cup/Europa League title after 1980. Frankfurt became the first German side since Schalke 04 in 1997 to win the competition. As winners, they earned the right to play against the winners of the 2021–22 UEFA Champions League, Real Madrid, in the 2022 UEFA Super Cup, and qualified for the 2022–23 UEFA Champions League group stage.

Teams
In the following table, finals until 2009 were in the UEFA Cup era, since 2010 were in the UEFA Europa League era.

Venue

This was the first Europa League final to be held at the stadium. It previously hosted the 1986 European Cup final. The city of Seville hosted the 2003 UEFA Cup final at the Estadio de La Cartuja. Spain had hosted four other UEFA Cup finals (holding a leg in 1977, 1985, 1986, and 1988).

Host selection

An open bidding process was launched on 28 September 2018 by UEFA to select the venues of the finals of the UEFA Champions League, UEFA Europa League, and UEFA Women's Champions League in 2021. Associations had until 26 October 2018 to express interest, and bid dossiers must be submitted by 15 February 2019.

UEFA announced on 1 November 2018 that three associations had expressed interest in hosting the 2021 UEFA Europa League final, and on 22 February 2019 that two associations submitted their dossiers by the deadline.

The following associations expressed interest in hosting but eventually did not submit bids:
Austria: Ernst-Happel-Stadion, Vienna
Czech Republic: Sinobo Stadium, Prague
Hungary: Puskás Aréna, Budapest

The Ramón Sánchez Pizjuán was selected by the UEFA Executive Committee during their meeting in Ljubljana, Slovenia on 24 September 2019.

On 17 June 2020, the UEFA Executive Committee announced that due to the postponement and relocation of the 2020 final, Seville would instead host the 2022 final.

Road to the final

Note: In all results below, the score of the finalist is given first (H: home; A: away).

Background
This was Eintracht Frankfurt's third final in a major UEFA competition, having lost the 1960 European Cup final to Real Madrid and won the 1980 UEFA Cup final. Having become the first German team in a major European final since Bayern Munich in the 2020 UEFA Champions League final and the first UEFA Cup/Europa League finalist from Germany since Werder Bremen in 2009, they were seeking to become the first German side since Schalke 04 in 1997 to win the competition. Their manager Oliver Glasner was seeking to become the first Austrian to win a European trophy since Ernst Happel in the 1983 European Cup final and the first Austrian to win the UEFA Cup/Europa League.

This was Rangers' fifth final in a major UEFA competition, having won the 1972 European Cup Winners' Cup final and lost both the 1961 and 1967 Cup Winners' Cup finals as well as the 1972 European Super Cup and the 2008 UEFA Cup final. Having become the first Scottish club in any European final since themselves in 2008, they were seeking to become the first Scottish club since Aberdeen in the 1983 European Super Cup to win a European trophy and the first Scottish side to win the UEFA Cup/Europa League. Their manager Giovanni van Bronckhorst was seeking to become the first Dutch to win a European trophy since Dick Advocaat with Zenit Saint Petersburg in the 2008 UEFA Super Cup; they were qualified after defeating Rangers in the year's UEFA Cup final.

The two sides previously met twice in European competitions, in the 1959–60 European Cup semi-finals, with Eintracht Frankfurt winning both legs.

Pre-match

Identity
The logo of the 2022 UEFA Europa League Final was unveiled at the group stage draw on 27 August 2021 in Istanbul.

Ambassador
The ambassador for the final was former Sevilla goalkeeper Andrés Palop.

Officials

On 11 May 2022, UEFA named Slovenian official Slavko Vinčić as the referee for the final. Vinčić had been a FIFA referee since 2010, and was previously an additional assistant referee in the 2017 UEFA Europa League Final and the fourth official in the 2021 UEFA Europa League Final. He also worked as an additional assistant referee in the 2012 UEFA Super Cup. He officiated ten matches in the 2021–22 Champions League season, with two matches in qualification, five in the group stage and three knockout fixtures. He served as a referee at UEFA Euro 2020, where he officiated two group matches and a quarter-final. He was joined by three of his fellow countrymen, with Tomaž Klančnik and Andraž Kovačič as assistant referees, and Jure Praprotnik as one of the assistant VAR officials. Srđan Jovanović of Serbia served as the fourth official, while Dutchman Pol van Boekel was appointed as the video assistant referee. Spaniards Alejandro Hernández Hernández and Roberto Díaz Pérez del Palomar served as the other assistant VAR officials.

Match

Details
The "home" team (for administrative purposes) was determined by an additional draw held after the quarter-final and semi-final draws.

Statistics

See also
2022 UEFA Champions League Final
2022 UEFA Europa Conference League Final
2022 UEFA Women's Champions League Final
2022 UEFA Super Cup
Eintracht Frankfurt in European football
Rangers F.C. in European football

Notes

References

External links

2022
Final
May 2022 sports events in Spain
Europa League Final 2022
2021–22 in German football
Europa League Final 2022
2021–22 in Scottish football
International club association football competitions hosted by Spain
2021–22 in Spanish football
Sports competitions in Seville
21st century in Seville
Association football penalty shoot-outs